The Trial (Spanish: La prueba) is a 2006 Peruvian drama road movie directed by Judith Vélez.

Cast
 Denisse Arreguí
 Mario Bedoya
 Eliana Borja
 José Borja
 Gianfranco Brero
 Enrique Casella
 Carlos Gonzales
 Doris Guillén
 Willy Gutiérrez
 Amaranta Kun
 Jimena Lindo
 Miguel Angel Medina
 David Mendoza
 Miguel Medina
 Franco Miranda

Awards and nominations

Won
Verona Love Screens Film Festival
2006: Best Film 
2007: Best Film

Nominated
Cartagena Film Festival
2007: Best Film

Huelva Latin American Film Festival
2006: Golden Colon

External links

2006 films

Peruvian drama road movies
2000s Peruvian films